Ithala Game Reserve is situated in 290 km2 of rugged, mountainous thornveld, about 400 km north of Durban, in northern KwaZulu-Natal, South Africa. It is one of the youngest game parks in South Africa. The altitude varies from 400 m along the Phongolo River to 1,450 m along the Ngotshe Mountain escarpment. The reserve consequently encompasses a great variation of terrain, from densely vegetated river valleys and lowveld to sourveld, high-lying grassland plateaus, mountain ridges and cliff faces.

Game
Grazers include impala, red hartebeest, tsessebe, blue wildebeest, eland and reedbuck. With the exception of reedbuck, these species have been observed to produce young seasonally around November to December in Ithala, when ample green forage is available. The browsers include duiker, bushbuck, nyala, kudu and giraffe, which deliver their young at any time of the year.

Reintroductions
All the big game species have been re-established with the exception of lion. Locally extinct red-billed oxpeckers were reintroduced from the Kruger Park, c. 1994, when 175 birds were released.

Plants
This reserve is likely the only place in KwaZulu-Natal where the rare tree Protea comptonii grows.

History 
 In the late 1800s land was given by King Dinizulu to boer farmers.
 In 1973 the then Natal Parks Board started buying up farms in this area to make up this Reserve.

Trivia 
  There are two abandoned gold mines in Ithala.

See also 
 List of conservation areas of South Africa

References

External links 
 KwaZulu-Natal Provincial Government homepage
 Ezemvelo KZN Wildlife (previous known as Natal Parks Board)
 South African National Parks Official Site

Ezemvelo KZN Wildlife Parks